Sir George Fermor of Easton Neston (died 1612) was an English soldier and landowner.

George Fermor was the son of Sir John Fermor (d. 1571) and his wife, Maud (d. 1579), a daughter of Nicholas Vaux, 1st Baron Vaux of Harrowden. George Fermor fought in the Netherlands and was knighted by the Earl of Leicester in 1586. He was Sheriff of Northamptonshire in 1589.

On 27 June 1603, he entertained the courts of James VI and I and Anne of Denmark, who had travelled separately from Scotland, at Easton Neston near Towcester. The king knighted his eldest son, Hatton Fermor. Lady Anne Clifford described the day; "From Althorpe the Queen went to Sir Hatton Fermor's where the King met her, where there were an infinite company of Lords and Ladies, and other people, such that the country could scarce lodge them." The royal party went next to Grafton Regis next.

Family
In 1572, he married Mary Curzon (d. 1628), a former lady-in-waiting to Elizabeth I of England, and daughter of Thomas Curzon of Addington and Agnes Hussey. Their children included:

 Hatton Fermor (d. 1640), who married Elizabeth Anderson, daughter of Edmund Anderson, Chief Justice of the Common Pleas, and secondly, Anna Cockayne, daughter of William Cockayne, Lord Mayor of London. Their eldest son was Sir William Fermor, 1st Baronet.
 Robert Fermor (b c1582 d 1616), who married Mary Bolles(b. ca. 1582 – d ca. 1616), had family estates in Ireland, one next door to William Penn. Son, Major Jasper Farmar Sr. (1610-1685), emigrated from Ireland with his family to Pennsylvania in 1685 but died on the voyage along with son Jasper Farmar Jr. Rest of the family established themselves in Pennsylvania and New Jersey.
 Agnes Fermor (d. 1617), who married Sir Richard Wenman of Thame Park.
 Elizabeth Fermor, who married Sir William Stafford of Blatherwycke, and secondly Sir Thomas Chamberlayne, Chief Justice of Cheshire.
 Jane Fermor (d. 1638), who married and subsequently divorced, after a bitter decade-long battle, Sir John Killigrew of Falmouth Castle
 Catherine Fermor, who married William Hoby of Hailes
 Anne (or Mary) Fermor, who married Robert Crichton, 8th Lord Crichton of Sanquhar (d. 1612), and secondly, Barnabas O'Brien, 6th Earl of Thomond. She was the patron of the author Owen Feltham.

References

Sources
 Genealogies of Pennsylvania Families from the Pennsylvania Genealogical Magazine. Volume I: Arnold-Hertzel Farmar of Ardevalaine, County Tipperary, Ireland, and of Whitemarsh, Philadelphia County, PA.

External links
 Portrait of man called Sir George Fermor, Royal Collection Trust, RCIN 406184
 Portraits of Sir George Fermor and Mary Curzon, Sotheby's, Easton Neston sale, 2005

1612 deaths
16th-century English people
High Sheriffs of Northamptonshire